Chunikhel is a village and former Village Development Committee that is now part of Budanilkantha Municipality in Kathmandu District in Province No. 3 of central Nepal. At the time of the 2011 Nepal census it had a population of 4,449 living in 859 households.
Chunikhel it has 15 VDC in total. It is located in 27°45'31.1"N 85°22'17.0"E just few kilometre away from heart of kathmandu. Chunikhel is gate for entering Shivapuri National park.

References

Populated places in Kathmandu District